Bear Canyon is an unincorporated community in northern Alberta in Clear Hills County, located  west of Peace River, approximately  northwest of Grande Prairie.

Localities in Clear Hills County